Sileby is a former industrial village and civil parish in the Soar Valley in Leicestershire, between Leicester and Loughborough. Nearby villages include Barrow upon Soar, Mountsorrel, Ratcliffe-on-the-Wreake, Seagrave and Cossington. The population of the civil parish at the 2011 census was 7,835.

The origins of the village date back to around 840 AD when the area was settled by the Danes - Leicestershire forming part of the Danelaw along with other counties in the vicinity. The name Sileby may in fact come from the Danish name 'Sighulf'.

The village lies at the bottom of an ancient valley created by the nearby River Soar, meaning that surrounding farmland is particularly prone to flooding during persistent or heavy rain.

History
Traditionally, Sileby was split into two wards, separated by the brook that flows through the middle of the village. These are St Mary's to the north and St Gregory's to the south. Recently however, due to Boundary Commission changes, a third ward of ‘Barrow West’ was added albeit as an arbitrary boundary essentially for electoral purposes. This division was strongly resented at the time owing to local rivalries and the idea of a portion of the village being annexed was not popular. In practice however this division is largely ignored. Even the idea of the two traditional wards is becoming somewhat lost as the village grows and new people move in unaware of the significance of the historical division.

One of Sileby's most distinguishing features is the Anglican church of St. Mary founded around 1152. It is a Grade II* listed building, and only 4% of listed buildings in the country are Grade II* status, which means it is of very significant interest. The Gothic tower now houses a fine ring of 10 bells, which attract ringers from far and wide. The church has an active congregation and hosts Ladies Fellowship on Tuesday afternoons and Squeals for Tots on a Thursday morning. There is an active youth ministry and children's work led by Leonie Poole the Children and Families Worker. The church is open from 2pm on a Wednesday for coffee. The Rector is the Revd Duncan Beet. The service on a Sunday is at 11.00am and there are both children and youth groups in the state of the art St Mary's Centre. There is also a crèche in the main church building.

Sileby Primitive Methodist Church was built in 1866 to the designs of James Kerridge. Sileby Wesleyan Methodist Church on High Street was built in 1884.

Sileby industrialised heavily over the Victorian period, with several hosiery and shoe factories present in the village until as recently as the 1980s, as well as a wallpaper manufacturer and several engineering companies. Nearly all of these have now disappeared and most of the factory premises have long since been demolished and replaced by new housing estates - it is now a commuter town for people who work throughout the East Midlands and beyond.

Transport

The village has a railway station on the Ivanhoe Line, and trains run hourly to Leicester, Loughborough, Nottingham and Lincoln.

Centrebus service 27 and Kinchbus service 2 both link Sileby to Loughborough which also gives further connections to the Skylink Leicester-Derby buses which run to East Midlands Airport which is around 15 miles away. The Kinchbus service to Leicester was withdrawn from September 4th, 2022, leaving the village with no bus service to the city, no evening service to Loughborough and no public transport whatsoever on Sundays.

Local road transport links via the nearby A6 and A46 link directly to the M1, which lies to the west. The A46 to the village's east follows the route of the Fosse Way to Lincoln in the north and provides a link to the east coast of England. The local area is prone to flooding from the River Soar and its tributaries, meaning that access and egress can be limited in persistently wet weather with some local roads becoming impassable for days or even weeks at a time during autumn/winter/spring.

The proximity to the River Soar also means that Sileby has an active marina where some residents live on narrowboats and others store their pleasurecraft at the permanent moorings available. Boats can also be hired as well as minor repair work undertaken and boat supplies purchased at the small chandlery.

Facilities
Current facilities/amenities in the village include:

Two doctors surgeries
Two pharmacies
One Opticians (accepts NHS and private patients)
Two primary schools
Several places of worship for the various Christian denominations
Several pre-school/nursery establishments
Two smaller-size supermarkets (Tesco and Costcutter)
One dentist (accepts NHS and private patients)
Numerous takeaway food establishments
Various shops, "beauty salons" and cafes (mostly concentrated in the High Street and King Street area)
Two vehicle maintenance garages offering MOT tests/servicing etc.
Two private members-only gyms  
Several sports pitches/facilities and community park areas
High Street Accountants

There are no Police/Fire/Ambulance stations or hospitals in or around Sileby. The nearest Police station is at Loughborough. The nearest Fire station is at Birstall. Ambulances and paramedic vehicles regularly patrol the local area but the nearest Accident & Emergency facilities are at Leicester Royal Infirmary. For less serious/urgent incidents treatment can be obtained at Loughborough Urgent Care Centre.

Other absent facilities include a petrol station (the nearest one is about 3 miles away), swimming pool (nearest one is at Mountsorrel's Soar Valley Leisure Centre) or refuse/recycling facility (again, the nearest one is at Mountsorrel).

Socialising
Pubs include The Horse & Trumpet, The Free Trade Inn, and The White Swan. These pubs cater for all tastes. The Horse and Trumpet, located at the top of Mountsorrel Lane opposite St Mary's Church is a popular village drinking house offering frequent entertainment and open fires with a large well-appointed function room which is free to hire. Further towards the middle of the village on Swan Street is The White Swan, which offers excellent food in a restaurant style setting; it is more geared towards diners than drinkers. The Free Trade Inn stands at the junction of Cossington Road and Manor Drive. This is one of the oldest buildings in Sileby, dating back to the 15th century and is a traditional pub serving some basic food but is more of a ‘drinkers’ pub offering a variety of unique hand-pulled beer and lager. The village also has the Working Men's Club on King Street (next to the Horse and Trumpet), and the newly refurbished Nineteen Twelve Bar(1912) on Cossington Road.

The Working Men's Club has a wide range of age groups amongst its membership, and holds traditional bingo nights. The Working Men's Club shows all's sporting events on HD Big screen TVs and hosts regular family events.

There are a number of takeaway food outlets, all situated within a few hundred yards of each other in the centre of the village. These include two chip shops, three Chinese takeaways, a kebab house/pizzeria and an Indian restaurant. "Yasmin's" Indian is the only place in the village for sit-down meals in a dedicated restaurant setting.

Sport
Sileby has a great number of sporting clubs, many of which have enjoyed success in recent years. There are well established clubs and facilities for cricket, football, tennis, lawn bowls, rugby, baseball and shooting amongst others.

Sileby Town Rugby Football Club (also known as the Sileby Vikings) was established in 2006 and now plays in Midlands Division 4 East (South), as well as the local Leicestershire Leagues, using the facilities at Platts Lane Recreation Ground in the nearby village of Cossington. They currently run a First XV, Second XV and since August 2015 a Ladies XV has also been added. They also raise thousands of pounds for local and national charities in August each year by pulling a 10-tonne truck for 10 miles through the local villages using nothing but people power. This is a very popular event that draws crowds of villagers along the route and also to welcome them back and join in the celebrations.

Long Alley Skittles is a sport that is fairly unique to this part of the East Midlands and there are two venues in the village where it can be played, with two teams based at each. The Working Men's Club and Conservative Club both have skittle alleys which play host to competitive league fixtures on most Friday nights throughout the season (usually September to April).

Community
Sileby has a community magazine, Talk@Sileby. The magazine is published by volunteers three times a year. Electronic copies of all issues can be found on the village website (another project run by volunteers).

Sileby Community Centre is located on the High Street and has a large main hall with numerous ancillary rooms including a kitchen and bar, as well as a separate sports hall. The main hall contains a large stage area for performances, with an adjoining room where props can be stored and performers can get changed and access the stage. The Community Centre is housed in what was formerly Sileby Wesleyan Methodist Church that was given to the village some years ago and is now managed by the Parish Council. Many different classes and events regularly take place here for all ages, including badminton, Zumba dancing and junior gymnastics classes.

Sileby Library was handed over by L.C.C. to a group of trustees/volunteers in December, 2015 and is now known as Sileby Community Library.

There is an active Scout group which meets at its HQ on Brook Street and includes Rainbows, Brownies, Guides, Beavers, Cubs and Scouts classes on weekday evenings.

There are now several cafes in the village, including "The Green Place" which also doubles as an eco-friendly and recycling educational centre with natural habitats and small ponds for wildlife for people to enjoy.

Sileby has shifted from its industrial past producing clothing to being a commuter town, with few industrial buildings remaining. Notable survivors are the factories on Seagrave Road, currently occupied by the village's last remaining hosier amongst other uses.

Notable residents
 David Howe, speedway rider

Development
The village has expanded greatly in the past few years, with several hundred new houses having been built and the former "Maltings" buildings (part of an old brewery that used to be based in the village in the 1800s) redeveloped as houses and flats.

Many business premises have also changed hands and been redeveloped recently, adding to the recent trend of increased long-term investment throughout the village.

In recent years, Sileby has seen increased housing developments due to the selling of local agricultural areas and farmlands, such as the newest estate off Ratcliffe Road, near to Ratcliffe on the Wreake, two more developments have also been completed near the village of Seagrave. There are plans for a new housing estate to be built between Sileby and Cossington, Leicestershire.

Many villagers object to the increased population and housing in Sileby due to increased risk of flooding and the lack of educational facilities, shops, and health services.

References

External links

 Sileby-village.co.uk
 Sileby Parish Council
 Sileby Town RFC "The Vikings"

Villages in Leicestershire
Civil parishes in Leicestershire